The Continental Beach Soccer Tournament is a beach soccer tournament contested between top ranked Asian teams who are invited to participate. The first edition was held in Ordos, China in 2016.

Summaries

Overall standings
As 2016

Note:
Win in Common Time W = 3 Points / Win in Extra Time WE = 2 Points / Win in Penalty shoot-out WP = 1 Point / Lose L = 0 Points

External links
 Beach soccer set to wow Ordos crowds

References 

Asian Football Confederation competitions for national teams
Continental Beach Soccer Tournament
Recurring sporting events established in 2016
2016 establishments in Asia